The Chinese Taipei national under-20 football team represents Taiwan in youth level international football competitions and is controlled by Chinese Taipei Football Association.

AFC U-19 Championship

 AFC U-19 Championship

AFC U-20 Asian Cup

  AFC U-20 Asian Cup

Current squad

2018 AFC U-19 Championship Qualification
Team Squad for 2018 AFC U-19 Championship qualification

AFC U-19 Championship Indonesia 2018
Team Squad for 2018 AFC U-19 Championship

See also

Chinese Taipei national football team
Chinese Taipei national under-23 football team

References

External links
  Chinese Taipei Football Association

Asian national under-20 association football teams
under-20
National youth sports teams of Taiwan